Thirst Street is a 2017 black comedy film directed by Nathan Silver, from a screenplay by Silver and C. Mason Wells. It stars Lindsay Burdge, Damien Bonnard, Esther Garrel, Lola Bessis, Jacques Nolot, Françoise Lebrun, Cindy Silver, Valerie Laury, and Anjelica Huston. The film is about an American woman who falls in love with a French man after a one-night stand, then decides to doggedly pursue him despite his lack of interest, with tragic results.

Thirst Street had its world premiere at the Tribeca Film Festival on April 21, 2017. It was released on September 20, 2017, by Samuel Goldwyn Films.

Plot
Gina (Lindsay Burdge) is an American flight attendant in her mid-30s who is still coming to terms with the suicide of her boyfriend (played in flashbacks by Damien Bonnard). During a layover in Paris, she and two of her co-workers end up at a strip club, thinking it will be a cabaret. There she meets the manager, Jerome (Bonnard); she is drawn to him in part because of his resemblance to her late boyfriend. The two have a one-night stand, and then she comes back the next day and the two have sex again. On a whim, Gina decides to quit her job, move to Paris, and get an apartment across the street from Jerome's; she then also gets a job as a waitress at the strip club, all in an attempt to start a relationship with Jerome. Jerome shows growing discomfort with her, and rekindles his relationship with his on-again, off-again rock singer girlfriend, Clémence, eventually proposing to Clémence. Depressed, Gina stops paying her rent checks or going to work, resulting in her being kicked out of her apartment and fired from her job. She decides to devote herself full-time to getting together with Jerome, and lies to him that she is pregnant with his child. After finding out the truth, Jerome runs away from Gina into the street and is hit by a car, ending up in a coma. Gina tells the people at the hospital that she is Jerome's fiancée, and receives his possessions, including the engagement ring he bought, which she proudly wears.

Cast
 Lindsay Burdge as Gina
 Damien Bonnard as Jerome 
 Esther Garrel as Clémence 
 Lola Bessis as Charlie
 Jacques Nolot as Franz
 Françoise Lebrun as Landlady
 Cindy Silver as Lorraine
 Valerie Laury as Faye
 Alice de Lencquesaing as Sophie
 Anjelica Huston as Narrator

Production
In May 2016, it was announced Lindsay Burdge, Damien Bonnard, Lola Bessis, Alice de Lencquesaing and Cindy Silver joined the cast of the film, with Nathan Silver directing the film from a screenplay he co-wrote alongside C. Mason Wells. Claire-Charles Gervais, Katie Stern, Ruben Amar, Lola Bessis, Josh Mandel, and Matthew Edward Ellison, will serve as producers on the film. In March 2017, it was announced Anjelica Huston would narrate the film.

Release
The film had its world premiere at the Tribeca Film Festival on April 21, 2017. Shortly after, Samuel Goldwyn Films acquired distribution rights to the film. It was released on September 20, 2017.

Critical reception
Thirst Street received positive reviews from film critics. It holds a 75% approval rating on review aggregator website Rotten Tomatoes, based on 6 reviews, with a weighted average of 9/10.

References

External links
 
 

2017 films
2017 black comedy films
2017 comedy-drama films
2017 independent films
2010s romantic thriller films
American black comedy films
American comedy-drama films
American comedy thriller films
American independent films
American romantic thriller films
Films set in Paris
French black comedy films
French comedy-drama films
English-language French films
French independent films
French comedy thriller films
2010s French-language films
Samuel Goldwyn Films films
2010s English-language films
2010s American films
2010s French films